IC3 is a Danish-built train.

IC3 may also refer to:

IC3 (certification), the Internet and Computing Core Certification
I-C3 (In-Cell Charge Control),  a type of NiMH battery patented by Rayovac
 IC3, one of the IC codes used by British police
 IC3 Convention Center, convention center in Cebu City, Philippines
Internet Crime Complaint Center, an American cyber crime task force composed of the FBI, National White Collar Crime Center and the Bureau of Justice Assistance
An abbreviation for indole-3-carbinol
"IC3", a song by British rapper Ghetts from his 2021 album Conflict of Interest

See also
 ISEE-3